Streptomyces polymachus is a bacterium species from the genus of Streptomyces which has been isolated from soil from the Bongnae Falls in South Korea. Streptomyces polymachus has antimicrobial and antifungal activity.

See also 
 List of Streptomyces species

References

Further reading

External links
Type strain of Streptomyces polymachus at BacDive -  the Bacterial Diversity Metadatabase	

polymachus
Bacteria described in 2015